Salim Shahed (born 28 July 1970) is a former Bangladeshi first-class cricketer who played for Barisal Division. , he was a match referee.

References

External links
 

1970 births
Living people
Bangladeshi cricketers
Barisal Division cricketers
Place of birth missing (living people)